Bobinogs (original Welsh title: Bobinogi) is a British children's television programme that aired on CBeebies, and it was produced by Adastra Creative for BBC Cymru Wales. It debuted for a Welsh audience, but in 2004, it started being broadcast in the market in the United Kingdom. It originally featured a child named Owen (portrayed by David Bursey) and three characters who lived in his hat: inanimate when he was present, but active when he was out.

This aspect of the series was later dropped; the characters were then active (in cartoon form) from the beginning of the programme.

The three main characters play in a band. In most episodes, they would try to solve a problem, then perform a song about it at the end. At one point in every episode, they would obtain a clue to the problem's solution by looking through their "bobinoculars", which show video footage from the real world.

Characters
 Owen: Portrayed by David Pursey
 Ogi: Drums and DJ, Voiced by Martyn Ellis
 Bobin: Keyboards, Voiced by Dionne Morgan
 Nib: Vocals, Voiced by Michelle McTernan
 Bobinoculars: Voiced by Martyn Ellis

Other characters
 Mamgu Bobiknot, Voiced by Olwen Rees
 Ollie Mindybob, Voiced by Martyn Ellis
 Robina, Voiced by Dionne Morgan
 Molly, Voiced by Olwen Rees
 Fireman Prout, Voiced by Martyn Ellis
 Nibin, Voiced by Michelle McTernan
 Phil the Shelf, Voiced by Martyn Ellis
 Mal Mechanic, Voiced by Martyn Ellis (series 1), Morgan Hopkins (series 2 and 3)
 Cyril the Dragon, Voiced by Martyn Ellis
 Brenda the Bus, Voiced by Dionne Morgan
 Ffion the Farmer, Voiced by Michelle McTernan
 Nogdog, Vocals by Martyn Ellis and Morgan Hopkins

External links
 
 CBeebies – Bobinogs at BBC
2000s British animated television series
2000s British children's television series
2000s Welsh television series
2003 British television series debuts
2006 British television series endings
Animated television series about children
British children's animated musical television series
British flash animated television series
British preschool education television series
English-language television shows
BBC children's television shows
BBC television musicals
CBeebies
S4C original programming
Animated preschool education television series
2000s preschool education television series
Television series by BBC Studios